Christer Boustedt (21 March 1939 in Bromma – 4 September 1986 in Alfta, Ovanåker Municipality) was a Swedish musician and actor.

He was primarily a jazz musician playing the saxophone, and contributed film music to many Swedish films.

He was considered to be one of Sweden's most renowned jazz musicians of his time, and teamed with several of the most famous musicians in the genre, in Sweden and internationally. As an alto saxophone player  he was much influenced by Charlie Parker and worked in the bebop tradition. This was especially signified on one of his most noticed albums: Blues, Ballads and Bebop (1985). He also had an acting career, and participated in a number of films, among them Made in Sweden (1969), award winning Sven Klangs Kvintett (Sven Klang's Combo, 1976) and Göta kanal eller Vem drog ur proppen? (1981).

Albums
 Plays Thelonious Mon (1983)
 Blues, Ballads and Bebop (1985)
 The Essence Of George Russell (1986)

Selected filmography
 Made in Sweden (1969)
 Blushing Charlie (1970)
 Sven Klang's Combo (1976)
 Göta kanal eller Vem drog ur proppen? (1981)
 Annika (TV series, 1984)
 Lykkeland (1984)

References

1939 births
1986 deaths
Swedish jazz musicians
20th-century Swedish male actors
Male actors from Stockholm
Musicians from Stockholm